The 2018 Honduran Cup was the 13th edition of the Honduran Cup and the fourth as Copa Presidente.  The tournament was announced on 13 April 2018.

The cup was contested by 64 teams from the top 3 divisions.  There were a total of 10 teams from Liga Nacional (1st division), 28 from Liga de Ascenso (2nd division) and 26 from Liga Mayor (3rd division).

C.D. Marathón were the defending champions.  Platense F.C. obtained their third title after beating 2–1 Real C.D. España in the final and will face the league winners in the 2019 Honduran Supercup.

Schedule and format
The schedule for the first round was published on 28 June.  The tournament started on 22 July.

Round of 64

Round of 32
The schedule for the Round of 32 was unveiled on 14 August.

Round of 16
The drawing was performed on 27 August.

Quarterfinals
The draw was held on 18 September.

Semifinals

Final

Prizes

References

Honduran Cup seasons
Cup
Honduras